Abdelhak Mohamed Rabah (born June 21, 1981, in Mostaganem) is an Algerian football player. He currently plays for ASO Chlef in the Algerian Ligue Professionnelle 1.

Honours
 Won the Algerian Ligue Professionnelle 1 with ASO Chlef in 2011
 Finalist of the Algerian Cup with CA Bordj Bou Arréridj in 2009

External links
 DZFoot Profile
 

1981 births
Living people
People from Mostaganem
Algerian footballers
Algerian Ligue Professionnelle 1 players
ASO Chlef players
ASM Oran players
AS Khroub players
CA Bordj Bou Arréridj players
Algerian Ligue 2 players
Association football midfielders
21st-century Algerian people